Living on Tokyo Time  is a 1987 film starring Minako Ohashi and Ken Nakagawa and directed by Steven Okazaki.

It is a romantic comedy revolving around Japanese American rock musician Ken and his marriage of convenience to Kyoko, a young immigré from Japan who speaks limited English.

The film received a nomination for a Grand Jury Prize at the 1987 Sundance Film Festival.

External links

Official Site

Trivia: A quick glance of the old 'Beatles' house on Precita Ave. is in the film. The 'Beatles' house used to have a huge Beatles mural painted on its facade (which was painted over sometime in the 1990s).

1987 films
1987 romantic comedy films
American romantic comedy films
Films about Japanese Americans
Films directed by Steven Okazaki
Comedy-drama films about Asian Americans
1980s English-language films
1980s American films